Shiravane is a small village in Raigad district, Shrivardhan taluka, Maharashtra state in Western India. The 2011 Census of India recorded a total of 662 residents in the village.

References

Villages in Ratnagiri district